Paranar (Tamil: பரணர்) (c. 1st century CE) was a poet of the Sangam period, to whom 84 verses of the Sangam literature have been attributed, besides verse 6 of the Tiruvalluva Maalai.

Biography
Paranar belonged to the Paanar caste. He was the friend of Kapilar and Nakkirar I. He has sung various kings, namely, Kadal Pirakkottiya Senguttuvan, Cholan Uruvapatrer Ilanchet Senni, Cheraman Kadalottiya Velkelu Kuttuvan, Kudakko Neduncheralaadhan, and Cholan Verpatradakkai Perunarkilli.

Contribution to the Sangam literature
Paranar has written about 85 verses, including 17 in Kurunthogai, 12 in Natrinai, 32 in Agananuru, 13 in Purananuru, 10 in Pathitrupathu, and 1 in Tiruvalluva Maalai.

By praising the Chera king Senguttuvan, Paranar received Udambarkaattu Vaari and his son prince Kuttuvan Cheral as 'present'.

Views on Valluvar and the Kural
Paranar opines about Valluvar and the Kural text thus:

See also

 Sangam literature
 List of Sangam poets
 Tiruvalluva Maalai

Notes

References

 

Tamil philosophy
Tamil poets
Sangam poets
Tiruvalluva Maalai contributors